Cimiatene was an ancient division of Paphlagonia, which took its name from a hill fort, Cimiata, at the foot of the range of Olgassys. Mithridates Ktistes slightly after 302 BC made this his first stronghold, and so became master of the Pontus. The territory remained a possession of the kings of Pontus until the death of Mithridates Eupator in 63 BC and the fall of the kingdom.

References
Smith, William (editor); Dictionary of Greek and Roman Geography, "Cimiatene", London, (1854)

Notes

Ancient Greek geography
Geography of Paphlagonia